Cosmo Fujiyama (born August 27, 1985) is a Japanese-American philanthropist who co-founded Students Helping Honduras.  She and her brother, Shin Fujiyama, created incorporated Students Helping Honduras in 2007 after visiting Honduras on a service learning trip. Fujiyama holds a Bachelor's degree in American Studies and Women's Studies from The College of William & Mary.

Fujiyama resigned from SHH in August 2010.

References 

1985 births
Living people
American philanthropists
College of William & Mary alumni
Japanese emigrants to the United States
Japanese philanthropists